Gifaata or Gifaataa  is a cultural festival celebrated by the Wolayta people in the Southern Region of Ethiopia. This festival is celebrated each year in September. In this  celebration, the Wolayta accept the New Year and send off the old one. Gifaata means, "the beginning," and is also considered the bridge from old to new, dark to light. During Gifaata, the Wolayta dance and enjoy cultural foods. The significance of Gifaata is to eliminate issues of the past and start afresh, reconciling past quarrels and strengthening family and community ties moving forward.

Chronology
The royal advisers summoned to the palace by census experts, when the old year draws to a closer.  Then, the royal advisors go out at night to determine the roots of the lunar cycle, the four parts of the moon: i.e. (poo'uwa, xumaa, xeeruwa, Goobana) and come with the numbered signs of the year and observe the full moon cycle and announce it to the king and his advisers. After telling the king exactly the date, they return home with a reward, and the king's approach to the festival will be told to the people by proclamation at the market and public meetings.

References

Festivals in Ethiopia
Wolayita
New Year celebrations
Food and drink appreciation
September observances